Voyah (岚图) is an automobile manufacturer specializing in designing and developing electric vehicles. Voyah is the luxury division of Chinese State-owned automaker Dongfeng Motor Corporation.

Two concepts were unveiled at the brand's launch in 2020, the Voyah i-Land coupe concept and the Voyah i-Free crossover concept that previews the Voyah Free premium crossover that was introduced in 2021. The design of Voyah vehicles were co-developed with ItalDesign. Both concept vehicles previews the production cars of Voyah in the following years, and the initial concept and production cars are all built on Dongfeng's Essa electric platform.

Brand history
The Voyah brand was launched in September 2020 during the 2020 Beijing Auto Show alongside the i-Free and i-Land concepts.

On 18 December 2020, Voyah Free, the first model of Voyah, was officially launched. The Voyah Free is available in two power combinations, extended range and pure electric.

Products

Voyah Free

The first product of the Voyah brand is the Voyah Free full-size crossover SUV available as an electric vehicle and a plug-in hybrid vehicle.

Voyah Dreamer

The second product of the Voyah brand is the Voyah Dreamer MPV unveiled during the 2021 Guangzhou Auto Show.

Voyah Chasing Light

The third product of the Voyah brand is the Voyah Chasing Light or previously codenamed H53 Executive sedan unveiled during November 2022.

See also
 Tesla, Inc.
 Rivian
 Faraday Future
 Fisker Inc.
 Karma Automotive
 Lucid Motors
 Nio
 HiPhi
 Li Auto

References

Electric vehicle manufacturers of China
Car brands
Car manufacturers of China
Chinese brands